John Hopkins the Third ( / The Missing Million) is a 1921 German film directed by Wolfgang Neff and featuring Béla Lugosi as the villain (a Western cowboy role). It was also known as Johann Hopkins III.

Cast
In alphabetical order
 Curt Cappi – D. I. Winsor (credited as Curd Cappi)
 Sybill de Brée
 Fritz Falkenberg – Eddy Corvin
 Harry Frank – John Hopkins, the detective
 Frydel Fredy
 Béla Lugosi - as The Villain
 Ludwig Rex
 Preben J. Rist – W. R. Turner George Corvin
 Alfred Schmasow – Commissar Sam
 Lya Sellin – die schwarze Mary
 Heinrich von Korff – Mat Bliß

See also
 Béla Lugosi filmography

References

External links

1921 films
Films of the Weimar Republic
German black-and-white films
German silent feature films